Ivica Tanković is a Croatian former footballer who played as a midfielder.

Tanković played in the Yugoslav First League with NK Zagreb in 1969. Throughout his tenure with Zagreb he played in the 1969–70 Inter-Cities Fairs Cup. In 1974, he played in the National Soccer League with Hamilton Croatia.

References 

Year of birth missing (living people)
Living people
Place of birth missing (living people)
Association football midfielders
Yugoslav footballers
GNK Dinamo Zagreb players
NK Zagreb players
Hamilton Croatia players
Yugoslav First League players
Canadian National Soccer League players
Yugoslav expatriate footballers
Expatriate soccer players in Canada
Yugoslav expatriate sportspeople in Canada